Tumiati is a surname. Notable people with the surname include:

Gaetano Tumiati (1918–2012), Italian journalist, writer, and literary critic
Gualtiero Tumiati (1876–1971), Italian actor and stage director
Giovanni Tumiati (died 1804), Italian anatomist from Ferrara

Italian-language surnames